Roads to Judah is the debut studio album by the American blackgaze band Deafheaven. The album was released by Deathwish Inc. on April 26, 2011. Roads to Judah was recorded in four days between December 2010 and January 2011.

About
The album title is a reference to N Judah, one of the busiest lines in the San Francisco transit system. Lyrically, the album is about Clarke's substance abuse.

Reception 
Roads to Judah was met with generally positive reviews. Shane Mehling of Decibel gave the album an eight out of ten, and praised it for pushing the boundaries of black metal. He wrote that, "This band produces long, incredibly beautiful black metal that, aside from the buried shrieks of the vocalist, doesn't have a drop of evil or noticeable malice" and that Deafheaven is "sure as hell doing a lot more with the genre than the newest batch of gauntlet-wearing Darkthrone worshipers." Graham Scala of RVA Magazine wrote that Deafheaven's songs are, "all a series of graceful transitions and dynamic shifts in timbre, rather than marathon blastbeat sessions or one effects-laden crescendo after another. This is a distinction which not only separates them from the majority of their contemporaries, but has provided the basis for a memorable and compelling release." However, Alex Deller of Rock Sound gave the album a six out of ten stating that Deafheaven's blend of black metal and shoegaze was not "an entirely new proposition" and compared the album to the music of Liturgy.

Accolades 
{|class="wikitable sortable"
|-
! Publication
! Country
! Accolade
! Rank
|-
| The A.V. Club
| align="center"| US
| Loud's Top 15 of 2011
| align="center"| 12
|-
| Decibel
| align="center"| US
| Top 40 Extreme Albums of 2011
| align="center"| 36
|-
| MSN
| align="center"| US
| The Top 50 Albums of 2011
| align="center"| 17
|-
| NPR
| align="center"| US
| The Best Metal Albums of 2011
| align="center"| 6
|-
| Pitchfork
| align="center"| US
| Top 40 Metal Albums of 2011
| align="center"| 22
|}

Track listing 
All songs written and recorded by Deafheaven.

Personnel 
Adapted from the album liner notes.

Deafheaven
  Nick Bassett – guitars
 George Clarke – vocals
 Trevor Deschryver – drums
 Kerry McCoy – guitars
 Derek Prine – bass

Production
 Jack Shirley – production, engineering, mixing, mastering
 Deafheaven – production

Artwork
 R. Sawyer – cover art, insert art
 N. Steinhardt – package design

References 

2011 debut albums
Deathwish Inc. albums
Deafheaven albums
Albums produced by Jack Shirley